Sévérin Maxime Quenum (born November 1962), is a Beninese politician and lawyer and academic who is the current Minister of Justice since 5 June 2018.

References

1962 births
Living people
21st-century Beninese politicians
Justice ministers of Benin